William Weston II (died c. 1419) was an English Member of Parliament.

He was elected the Member of Parliament for Sussex in 1415. He was appointed Sheriff of Surrey and Sussex for 1417.

He married Joan, the daughter of Thomas Wintershall of Bramley, Surrey and had one son.

References 

1410s deaths
English MPs 1415
Members of Parliament for Sussex
Year of birth unknown
Year of death uncertain
High Sheriffs of Surrey
High Sheriffs of Sussex